The Buzău Power Station is a large thermal power plant located in Buzău, Romania having four generation groups of 45 MW and one group of 27 MW and having a total electricity generation capacity of 207 MW.

References

Natural gas-fired power stations in Romania